LliureX is a project of the Generalitat Valenciana with the goal of introducing new ICTs based on free software in the Valencian Community education system.

It is a Linux distribution that is used on over 110,000 PCs in schools in the Valencia region.

Originally it was based on Debian but since version 7.09 it is based on Ubuntu and since version 19 on KDE neon.

Awards 
LliureX was awarded the Open Awards 2019 at the OpenExpo conference for its innovation in the field of education.

References

External links
 Official site (in Valencian and Spanish)
 

Educational operating systems
Spanish-language Linux distributions
Ubuntu derivatives
KDE
Valencian Community
Linux distributions